Sanxay is a commune in the Vienne department in the Nouvelle-Aquitaine region in western France. The population of Sanxay - as of 2017 - was 548.

See also
Communes of the Vienne department

References

Communes of Vienne
Monuments of the Centre des monuments nationaux